The 2011 Nottingham Challenge (known for sponsorship reasons as Aegon Nottingham Challenge) was a professional tennis tournament played on outdoor grass courts. It was part of the 2011 ATP Challenger Tour and the 2011 ITF Women's Circuit. It took place in Nottingham, Great Britain between June 6 and June 12, 2011.

ATP entrants

Seeds

Rankings are as of May 23, 2011.

Other entrants
The following players received wildcards into the singles main draw:
  Daniel Evans
  Richard Gabb
  Daniel Smethurst
  Alexander Ward

The following players received entry into the singles main draw as a special exemption:
  Bernard Tomic

The following players received entry from the qualifying draw:
  Carsten Ball 
  Richard Bloomfield
  Evgeny Kirillov
  Frederik Nielsen

ITF entrants

Seeds

Rankings are as of June 6, 2011.

Other entrants
The following players received wildcards into the singles main draw:
  Anna Fitzpatrick
  Katie O'Brien
  Lucy Brown
  Jade Windley

The following players received entry from the qualifying draw:
  Melinda Czink
  Tetiana Luzhanska
  Kristýna Plíšková
  Zhang Ling

Champions

Men's singles

 Dudi Sela def.  Jérémy Chardy, 6–4, 3–6, 7–5

Women's singles

 Elena Baltacha def.  Petra Cetkovská, 7–5, 6–3

Men's doubles

 Rik de Voest /  Adil Shamasdin def.  Treat Conrad Huey /  Izak van der Merwe, 6–3, 7–6(11–9)

Women's doubles

 Eva Birnerová /  Petra Cetkovská def.  Regina Kulikova /  Evgeniya Rodina, 6–3, 6–2

References
Official website
ITF Search 
ATP official site

Nottingham Challenge
Nottingham Challenge
Nottingham Challenge
Nottingham Challenge
Nottingham Challenge
2010s in Nottingham